The  Cleveland Gladiators season was the 11th season for the franchise in the Arena Football League, and the second while in Cleveland. The team was coached by Steve Thonn and played their home games at Quicken Loans Arena. The Gladiators missed out on the playoffs by finishing 5th in the National Conference with a 7–9 record.

Standings

Regular season schedule
The Gladiators began their season at home against the Rattlers on April 3. Their final regular season game was on July 31, when they hosted the Iron.

All times are EDT

Roster

Regular season

Week 1: vs. Arizona Rattlers

At halftime, the Gladiators led by three touchdowns, and never trailed in the entire game until giving up a 3-yard touchdown pass to go down 61–56 with 3:30 remaining. Quarterback John Dutton threw a pick on what would prove to be Cleveland's final drive, as their defense was unable to keep Arizona from running out the clock to end the game. It was just one of Dutton's 4 interceptions on the night, though he did have 7 touchdowns, and threw for 287 yards.

Week 2: at Chicago Rush

In a closely contested game that saw neither team at any point lead by more than a touchdown, the Gladiators fell to 0–2 after being unable to come up with the game's last score. Following a 13-yard passing touchdown and successful extra point to tie the game at 56–56, the Gladiators allowed the Rush to drive all the way to the 4-yard line, where the Rush kicked a field goal to go ahead. After taking the ensuing kickoff for a touchback, Brent Holmes caught a pass as time expired, but did not get far with the ball, failing to even cross midfield before being tackled, ending the game. Contributing to the loss was Cleveland's turnovers. Quarterback John Dutton threw for 379 yards, but had 3 interceptions in the game. Brent Holmes, Chris Johnson, and Ben Nelson each had over 100 yards receiving in the losing effort.

Week 3: at Oklahoma City Yard Dawgz

The Gladiators held a 14–0 lead early in the 2nd quarter, but the lead was cut to only 3 points at halftime when they allowed 4 touchdowns in the remainder of the half, including a kickoff returned for a touchdown, and a pair of 1-yard rushes into the end zone. In the 3rd quarter the Gladiators failed to score, falling into a hole they couldn't climb out of, as both teams scored 3 touchdowns each in the final quarter. Quarterback John Dutton attempted 50 passes, completing 35 for 309 yards and 7 touchdowns.

Week 4: BYE

Week 5: at Spokane Shock

The Gladiators won their first game of the season in the last seconds of the game, which featured several lead changes in the final minute. Spokane went ahead 61–59 lead with 46 seconds on the clock with a 2-yard touchdown pass. The Gladiators got back in front on a 27-yard catch by Ben Nelson. The extra point was missed, but Cleveland still held a 65–61 advantage. The Shock responded by driving 45 yards in 5 plays, capped off by a touchdown pass from 4 yards out, pulling back ahead 68–65 with just 8 seconds left. Brent Holmes received the ensuing kickoff 6 yards back in the end zone and took it all the way back for a touchdown, giving the Gladiators a 72–68 lead with only a second to play in the game. Following the kickoff to the Shock, time had expired, however Spokane was given one more shot from scrimmage as the result of a penalty on the Gladiators for unsportsmanlike conduct after their go-ahead score. Spokane quarterback Kyle Rowley threw a pass that fell short of his intended target, giving the victory to Cleveland.

John Dutton finished with 285 yards passing and 6 touchdowns, however threw 2 interceptions. Ben Nelson was the top receiver with 129 yards and 4 touchdowns on the night.

Week 6: at Iowa Barnstormers

The Gladiators fell behind by 12 points at one point in the 2nd quarter, but cut the Barnstormer's lead to 36–35 at halftime. In the 4th quarter, when the Gladiators took a 49–43 lead on a 4-yard touchdown reception by Victor Williams, they never trailed for the rest of the night. Putting the game away with a 32-yard touchdown catch by Chris Johnson with just over a minute to play, Cleveland won their second straight game. John Dutton had an outstanding night at quarterback, completing 31 of 39 passes, including his first 11 attempts. He finished with 355 passing yards and 5 touchdowns. Johnson, Williams, and Adam Tadisch each had a rushing touchdown. Ben Nelson had 3 receiving touchdowns, but it was Johnson who caught for the most yards, with 166.

Week 7: vs. Tulsa Talons

Week 8: at Jacksonville Sharks

Week 9: vs. Chicago Rush

Week 10: vs. Utah Blaze

Week 11: at Milwaukee Iron

Week 12: vs. Iowa Barnstormers

Week 13: at Tulsa Talons

Week 14: at Orlando Predators

Week 15: vs. Spokane Shock

Week 16: vs. Oklahoma City Yard Dawgz

Week 17: BYE

Week 18: vs. Milwaukee Iron

References

Cleveland Gladiators
Cleveland Gladiators seasons
Cleve